Killefer is a surname. Notable people with the surname include:

Bill Killefer (1887–1960), American baseball player, coach and manager
John Killefer (1833–1926), American businessman and inventor
Nancy Killefer (born 1953), American government consultant and political figure
Red Killefer (1885–1958), American baseball player